Substitution principle can refer to several things:
Substitution principle (mathematics)
Substitution principle (sustainability) 
Liskov substitution principle (computer science)